Douglas Ricardo Beattie   (born 13 October 1965) is a Northern Irish politician and former member of the British Army, who has been leader of the Ulster Unionist Party (UUP) since 27 May 2021. He has been a Member of the Northern Ireland Assembly (MLA)  for  Upper Bann since 2016. He is characterised as a 'progressive' and 'liberal' unionist.

Early life
Beattie was born in 1965 in a military base in Hampshire; his father was a warrant officer in the Royal Ulster Rifles, a regiment of the British Army. The family returned to Portadown, County Armagh, Northern Ireland, when he was 10 following the ending of his father's regular service. The family moved into a house in Union Street, in the densely-populated Edgarstown area on the outskirts of the town centre.

Beattie's mother died young, leaving his father (who had by this time enlisted with the Ulster Defence Regiment) to raise him, his three sisters and two brothers. At the age of 15 he accidentally shot a friend when the two of them found Beattie Snr's personal protection weapon and were playing with it. Although shot in the head, his friend recovered.

Military career
At the age of 16, in 1982, Beattie joined the Royal Irish Rangers and following training was posted to the 2nd Battalion who were stationed in Wavell Barracks, Berlin.

In over 28 years of service, he rose to the rank of Warrant Officer First Class (WO1) and was appointed regimental sergeant major. During that time he served in Bosnia, Kosovo, Iraq and Northern Ireland, being awarded the General Officer NI commendation, the Queen's Commendation for Bravery (for saving the lives of enemy soldiers) and the NATO Meritorious Service Medal. He was commissioned from the ranks in 2005, gaining promotion to captain.

During the Afghanistan War, as part of the Operational Mentoring and Liaison Team, Captain Beattie was part of an operation to retake the town of Garmsir in Helmand Province. As a result of his actions during the intense fighting over several days, he was recommended for, and subsequently awarded, the Military Cross.

Following his return from Afghanistan, Beattie published the first of two books, An Ordinary Soldier, which became an immediate best seller in the United Kingdom and propelled him into the public eye. Beattie's follow-up book was Task Force Helmand.

Political career
After retiring from the army, Beattie joined the Ulster Unionist Party and was elected to Armagh, Banbridge and Craigavon District Council for the Portadown area in the 2014 local elections.

In May 2016, he was elected as an MLA for the Upper Bann constituency.

Before the 2017 Ulster Unionist Party leadership election, Beattie was named by commentators as a possible contender to replace former leader Mike Nesbitt; however, in the end only Robin Swann ran, and was elected unopposed. In October 2019, after Swann announced he was standing down as leader of the party, Beattie ruled himself out of contention as the next leader and endorsed former Royal Navy commander Steve Aiken and served as Deputy instead.

Beattie stood as a candidate for Member of Parliament for Upper Bann in the 2019 General Election. He came fourth, losing to Carla Lockhart of the Democratic Unionist Party (DUP).

In May and September 2020 Beattie was threatened by the  South East Antrim UDA after he condemned threats they had made against journalists.

Beattie announced in May 2021 that he was putting his name forward to be the next leader of the UUP. He said that he would be "able to reach out to all people in Northern Ireland regardless of what your religion is, sexual orientation or ethnicity". Beattie was elected unopposed on 17 May 2021, and officially became leader on 27 May 2021.

In January 2022, Beattie apologised after posting a joke on Twitter about the wife of DUP politician Edwin Poots. In the aftermath, several of Beattie's historic tweets re-emerged, containing content that was perceived as "casually misogynistic", and including derogatory comments about women and members of the Irish Traveller community. The tweets were posted between 2011 and 2014, while Beattie was still a serving soldier and before he entered politics. Beattie said that he was "deeply ashamed" of the tweets.

Beattie attended protests against the Northern Ireland Protocol, the post-Brexit trade arrangements. In March 2022, he announced he would continue to oppose the Protocol but would no longer take part in the series of rallies. Beattie said they had been hijacked by loyalists to raise tensions "that now see a resurgence in UVF activity". Following this, his constituency office in Portadown was attacked, and a poster of a noose around his neck appeared at a loyalist rally in Lurgan.

Views
Beattie has been characterized as a 'progressive' and 'liberal' within the UUP, but said upon his election as leader that those with conservative values had "nothing to fear" from him and that he would "tread a path to make sure that your voice is heard and I will never denigrate your opinion". He proposed a motion in Stormont calling for a ban on gay conversion therapy, which passed, and argued it is "fundamentally wrong to view our LGBTQ community as requiring a fix or cure".

Beattie is against the Northern Ireland Protocol, the post-Brexit trade arrangements, believing it is damaging to the Good Friday Agreement. He said "I do not want a hardened border on the island of Ireland, but neither do I want a border in the Irish Sea".

A former soldier, Beattie has pressed for Northern Ireland to adopt the Armed Forces Covenant and ensure support for military veterans and their families. He also argues that soldiers who served during the Troubles should not be immune from prosecution, saying "Soldiers were here to stand between the terrorists and the terrorised. If they went outside the law then they have to face the law".

References

External links
Northern Ireland Assembly profile
Ulster Unionist Party profile

1965 births
Living people
Royal Irish Regiment (1992) officers
British Army personnel of the Iraq War
Ulster Unionist Party MLAs
British military personnel of The Troubles (Northern Ireland)
Northern Ireland MLAs 2016–2017
Northern Ireland MLAs 2017–2022
Councillors in County Antrim
Councillors in County Armagh
Councillors in County Down
People from Portadown
Recipients of the Military Cross
Recipients of the NATO Meritorious Service Medal
Recipients of the Queen's Commendation for Bravery
Northern Ireland MLAs 2022–2027
Leaders of the Ulster Unionist Party